German Social Union was a Strasserist political party founded in West Germany in 1956 by Otto Strasser. It was dissolved in 1962.

See also
 Black Front
 Socialist Reich Party
 German Social Union (East Germany)

External links
Germany's New Nazis 1951 pamphlet about neo--nazi groups

Neo-Nazism in Germany
Far-right political parties in Germany
Defunct political parties in Germany
German nationalist political parties
Strasserism
Third Position
Syncretic political movements
Neo-Nazi political parties in Europe